Kluge: The Haphazard Construction of the Human Mind is a 2008 non-fiction book by American psychologist Gary Marcus.

A "kluge" is a patched-together solution for a problem, clumsily assembled from whatever materials are immediately available. Marcus's book argues that the human brain employs many such kluges, and that evolutionary psychology often favors genes that give "immediate advantages" over genes that provide long-term value.

External links 
 Book review by The New York Times
 Book review by The Guardian

References 

2008 non-fiction books
Psychology books